The Chinese Northern Qi dynasty had six empresses consort in its history:

 Empress Li Zu'e (r. 550-559), the wife of Emperor Wenxuan.
 Empress Yuan (r. 560-561), the wife of Emperor Xiaozhao.
 Empress Hu (r. 561-565), the wife of Emperor Wucheng.
 Empress Hulü (r. 565-572), the first wife of Gao Wei.
 Empress Hu (r. 572-573), the second wife of Gao Wei.
 Empress Mu (r. 572-577), the third wife of Gao Wei.
Empress Hu and Empress Mu were co-empresses briefly from 572 to 573.